Róbert Nagy (born 3 June 1940) is a Hungarian weightlifter. He competed in the men's bantamweight event at the 1964 Summer Olympics.

References

1940 births
Living people
Hungarian male weightlifters
Olympic weightlifters of Hungary
Weightlifters at the 1964 Summer Olympics
Sportspeople from Székesfehérvár
20th-century Hungarian people